Stamford Bridge railway station was a railway station on the York to Beverley Line. It opened on 4 October 1847 and served the village of Stamford Bridge in the East Riding of Yorkshire, England. It closed after the last train on 27 November 1965.

Facilities when open
The station itself had three platforms: up, towards York, the west platform; down toward Beverley, the east platform, and a bay off the west side. The Station House building is on the down (East) side, consisting of two waiting rooms, and the stationmaster's office.
Also on the site was a two-road goods shed, which backed onto the down platform. The large yard between the goods shed and the station building served as a holding area for goods received or pending dispatch.

Current use
The station building now runs as a private members only club for residents of the village, with a bar, function room and lounge.
Local groups also use the Station House as a meeting venue.
The goods shed currently serves as a sports hall, after the addition of changing rooms on the south side of the building.
The east yard is now a car park, the west bay platform is the village play park.

Further reading

References

External links
 Stamford Bridge station on navigable 1947 O. S. map
 Stamford Bridge at Disused Stations 2011

Disused railway stations in the East Riding of Yorkshire
Former York and North Midland Railway stations
Railway stations in Great Britain opened in 1847
Railway stations in Great Britain closed in 1965
Beeching closures in England
1847 establishments in England
George Townsend Andrews railway stations
1965 disestablishments in England
Stamford Bridge